Addi Keyh, also Adi Keyh Adi jeganu (Addi Keyh "Red Village"), is a market town in Eritrea, lying approximatively 110 kilometers southeast of Asmara.  It lies almost 2,500 metres above sea level and has a population of around 40,000 people. They speak Tigrinya and saho. The ruins of Qohaito and Toconda lie near the town. Eritrea's College of Science and Arts, which cost $17 million to construct, is located in Adi Keih.  

Alternative spellings of its name include: Adi Caie, Addi Caieh, Adi Ciah, Adi Keih, Adi Qeyh, Adi Keyih and Adi Kaie.

Notable people 
 Yirgalem Fisseha Mebrahtu, poet

See also
List of highest towns by country

References

Subregions of Eritrea

Southern Region (Eritrea)
Populated places in Eritrea